Edward Bostwic Allen Jr. (May 5, 1918 – March 1, 2012) was an American football fullback who played one season in the National Football League (NFL) with the Chicago Bears and one season in the All-America Football Conference (AAFC) for the Brooklyn Dodgers.  Allen played college football at the University of Pennsylvania, and was head football coach at Drexel University

Early life and college career
Allen attended Batavia High School in Batavia, New York, where he was raised.

Allen played for three seasons on the Penn Quakers football team until 1940, when he left to serve in the United States Army Air Forces during World War II. He served until 1945 and achieved the rank of captain. Upon leaving the military, he returned to Penn for his fourth and final season. Allen was an All-American honorable mention at Penn.

Professional career
Allen was selected 94th overall (11th round, pick 4) in the 1946 NFL Draft by the Chicago Bears.  Allen appeared in nine games for the Bears, during the  NFL season.  During the season he played as both fullback and Punter.

The following year, Allen played for the Brooklyn Dodgers of the All-America Football Conference.

Coaching career
Allen began coaching at Daniels Field in 1941.  After serving as head coach at Upper Darby High School for the 1949 season, Allen was hired by Drexel University as head football coach in February 1950.  During the 1955 college football season, Allen led Drexel to an undefeated season.  In eight seasons as head coach at Drexel, Allen compiled an overall record of 33–24–1.  On January 10, 1958, Allen resigned as head coach in order to devote more time to an investment firm at which he had been recently given a major promotion.

Head coaching record

College

References

External links
 

1918 births
2012 deaths
American football fullbacks
Brooklyn Dodgers (AAFC) players
Chicago Bears players
Drexel Dragons football coaches
Penn Quakers football players
High school football coaches in Pennsylvania
People from Batavia, New York
People from Dansville, New York
Players of American football from New York (state)
United States Army Air Forces officers
United States Army Air Forces personnel of World War II